Grays Bay is an Arctic waterway in Kitikmeot Region, Nunavut, Canada. It is located in Coronation Gulf. Hepburn Island is located at its mouth. The Tree River and the Annielik River flow into the bay.

It is the ancestral home of the Kogluktuaryumiut, a Copper Inuit subgroup.

Grays Bay is on the Northwest Passage route.

Northwest Passage 

Grays Bay was proposed as the site of a potential dock facility. In 2007 Wolfden Resources received a favourable review "for its copper/zinc mine proposal from the Nunavut Impact Review Board (NIRB)." The proposal included plans for a 53-kilometre all-weather road that would include a dock facility at Grays Bay on the Coronation Gulf, and will parallel the Kennartic River to the mine site at High Lake."

Minerals and Metals Group's, MMG Minerals, a subsidiary of the Chinese state-owned Minmetals Resources Ltd., has also proposed a port "that could accommodate ships of up to 50,000 tonnes that would make 16 round trips a year — both east and west —through the Northwest Passage" and a "350-kilometre all-weather road with 70 bridges that would stretch from Izok Lake to Grays Bay." The multibillion-dollar Izok Corridor project is projected to produce 180,000 tonnes of zinc and another 50,000 tonnes of copper a year. In order to do this "Izok Lake would be drained, the water dammed and diverted to a nearby lake. Three smaller lakes at High Lake would also be drained. Grays Bay would be substantially filled in."
In their August 2012 proposal which has since been revised, MMG Minerals described the planned facilities at the Grays Bay Port that would "include a dock, concentration storage shed, fuel storage facilities and a camp. These facilities will support storage of concentrate, loading of bulk-carrier ships, and re-supply of fuel and goods for the Project." The Grays Bay port would be open three months of the year to "ship ore in two directions through both ends of the Northwest Passage."

References

Bays of Kitikmeot Region
Former populated places in the Kitikmeot Region